Journey to the Center of the Mind is the second studio album released by The Amboy Dukes.  It was released in April 1968 on Mainstream Records (stereo S/6112, mono 56112 (promo only)).

A remastered CD reissue was released in 1992 by Mainstream Direct Ltd. with one bonus track (MDCD 911).

Production

Journey to the Center of the Mind was recorded on a higher budget than the previous album, following the success of its single "Baby Please Don't Go", and features two new members to the line-up; Greg Arama replacing Bill White on bass, and Andy Solomon replacing Rick Lober on piano/organ. Stylistically, the album is a departure from its predecessor by abandoning much of their blues influences (with the exception of "Mississippi Murderer"). This was also the first Dukes album to feature all original songs, all of which were written by Ted Nugent and rhythm guitarist/singer Steve Farmer. The album was in part a commercial attempt to reach the counter-cultural market by producing somewhat of a concept album. Originally, the record's A- and B-sides were to be stylistically contrasted to each other, and written separately by Nugent and Farmer, respectively. The final project, however, includes most of the lyrics on the first half to be written by Farmer, while the second half features Nugent's only writing contribution to be the music for the album's title track and "Conclusion", which uses the same music. While Nugent's songs are more geared in the direction of hard rock that would pioneer into what is now considered an early precursor to heavy metal music, Farmer's work has much more of a psychedelic feel that tends to satirize the music scene at the time rather than embrace it, even going as far as to play out like a continual concept album. Despite the musical differences, the two sides are both experimental in their own right, as they were still in the process of developing their sound that Nugent would continue to reinvent until the end of the band's career.

Shortly after the album's release, Drake left the band over creative disputes, and was replaced by Rusty Day.

Track listing

On digital stores and streaming services, the track listing differs from the original, adding three tracks from the album Migration.

Personnel

The Amboy Dukes
John (J.B.) Drake – vocals
Ted Nugent – lead guitar, vocals
Steve Farmer – rhythm guitar, vocals
Greg Arama – bass
Dave Palmer – drums
Andy Solomon – organ, piano, vocals

Technical
Bob Shad – producer
Roy Cicala – engineer
Maxine Epstein – album coordinator
Jack Lonshein – cover design

Covers

The song "Journey to the Center of the Mind" was covered by Slade (as "Ambrose Slade") in 1969 on the album Beginnings, by The Ramones in 1994 on Acid Eaters and by Sun City Girls in 2001 on Libyan Dream.

References

1968 albums
The Amboy Dukes albums
Mainstream Records albums
Albums produced by Bob Shad